Minos Gouras (born 7 June 1998) is a German professional footballer who plays as a midfielder for  club SSV Jahn Regensburg.

Career
After playing youth football with Ludwigshafener SC, SC Freiburg and Astoria Walldorf and senior football with Astoria Walldorf II and Astoria Walldorf, Gouras joined 1. FC Saarbrücken on a two-year contract in July 2020.

References

External links
 
 

1998 births
Living people
German footballers
Greek footballers
Association football midfielders
FC Astoria Walldorf players
1. FC Saarbrücken players
SSV Jahn Regensburg players
2. Bundesliga players
3. Liga players
Regionalliga players
Oberliga (football) players
People from Speyer